The Women's National Basketball Association's Sixth Player of the Year Award is an annual Women's National Basketball Association (WNBA) award given since the 2007 WNBA season to the league's most valuable player for her team coming off the bench as a substitute—or sixth woman. A panel of sportswriters and broadcasters throughout the United States votes on the recipient. Each panel member casts a vote for first, second and third place selections. Each first-place vote is worth five points; each second-place vote is worth three points; and each third-place vote is worth one point. The player with the highest point total, regardless of the number of first-place votes, wins the award. To be eligible for the award, a player must come off the bench in more games than she starts.

The award was titled "Sixth Woman of the Year" through the 2020 season, with the word "Woman" replaced by "Player" in 2021.

Winners

Notes

See also

 List of sports awards honoring women

References

External links 
 
 
 

Awards established in 2007
Sixth